RTI Colombia, also known as Radio Televisión Interamericana (Inter-American Radio and Television), is a Colombian television production company and former programadora. It aired 14.5 hours per week of programming in 1993.
In the 1990s, as a programadora, it was a member of OTI Colombia, a coalition that included Producciones PUNCH, Producciones JES, RCN Television, Caracol Televisión and Datos y Mensajes.

Many of its series are co-produced with Telemundo in the United States, including Zorro and Sin Vergüenza. In Colombia, they air on Caracol TV and Citytv Bogotá. R.T.I. had some programming spaces on the state-owned Canal Uno until 2008, when it returned them in order to bid with El Tiempo and Grupo Planeta for the third private national channel licence.

Starting from 2007, the Telemundo-R.T.I. studio in Miami is known as Telemundo Television Studios.

R.T.I. Telenovelas

R.T.I. Series
 Fuego Verde (1996-1998)
 Los Pecados de Ines de Hinojosa (1988)
 Los Cuervos (1986)
 Cuando quiero llorar no lloro (aka Los Victorinos, 1991)
 El segundo enemigo (1988)
 Don Chinche (1982-1989)
 Zarabanda (1989)
 Yo y tú (1965-1977) (1985-1986)

Variety 
 Super Sábado (2000)
 La Bella y La Bestia (1997–1998)
 Quiere Cacao (1996–2001)
 Quac! El Noticero (1995–1997)
 Fantástico (1993)
 Miss Mundo Colombia (1992–present)
 TV Turismo (1988-1994)
 El Programa del Millón (1986–1990)
 Enviado Especial (1976–1996)

References

External links
 Official site

Television production companies of Colombia